Dahira falcata is a moth of the  family Sphingidae. It is known from Burma, Thailand, Malaysia and Indonesia.

References

Dahira
Moths described in 1963